Schulte is a German surname, derived from the word Schultheiß. Notable people with the surname include:

 Adolf Schulte (1894-1917), German flying ace
 Aloysius Schulte, St. Ambrose University president
 Dieter Schulte (born 1940), German labor leader
 Eduard Schulte (1891–1966), prominent German industrialist
 Edward J. Schulte (1890–1975), American architect
 Eike Wilm Schulte (born 1939), German operatic baritone
 Francis B. Schulte (1926–2016), American archbishop
 Frank Schulte (1882–1949), American baseball player
 Fred Schulte (1901–1983), center fielder in Major League Baseball
 Greg Schulte, American sportscaster
 Gregory Schulte, American ambassador to the International Atomic Energy Agency
 Henry Schulte, college football coach
 Johann Friedrich von Schulte (1827–1914), German legal historian and professor of canon law
 Johnny Schulte (1896–1978), professional baseball player
 Joshua Schulte (born 1988), former CIA employee, convicted of leaking documents
 Mary Leontius Schulte (1901–2000), American nun, mathematics educator, and historian of mathematics
 Michael Schulte (born 1990), German singer and songwriter
 Patricia Schulte, Canadian zoologist
 Paxton Schulte (born 1972), professional ice hockey player
 Ursula Schulte (born 1952), German politician
 Wildfire Schulte (1882–1949), American right fielder and left-handed slugger in Major League Baseball

See also
Julius Schulte-Frohlinde (1894–1968), Nazi German architect
Heike Schulte-Mattler (born 1959), German athlete
Schulte, Kansas, an unincorporated community in Kansas, United States
Schulte Hills, a group of hills in Antarctica

German-language surnames